Mott scattering in physics, also referred to as spin-coupling inelastic Coulomb scattering, is the separation of the two spin states of an electron beam by scattering the beam off the Coulomb field of heavy atoms. It is named after Nevill Francis Mott, who first developed the theory. It is mostly used to measure the spin polarization of an electron beam.

In lay terms, Mott scattering is similar to Rutherford scattering but electrons are used instead of alpha particles as they do not interact via the strong force (only weak and electromagnetic).  This enables them to penetrate the atomic nucleus, giving valuable insight into the nuclear structure.

The electrons are often fired at gold foil because gold has a high atomic number (Z), is non-reactive (does not form an oxide layer), and can be easily made into a thin film (reducing multiple scattering).  The presence of a spin-orbit term in the scattering potential introduces a spin dependence in the scattering cross section. Two detectors at exactly the same scattering angle to the left and right of the foil count the number of scattered electrons. The asymmetry, A, given by:

is proportional to the degree of spin polarization P according to A = SP, where S is the Sherman function.

The Mott cross section formula is the mathematical description of the scattering of a high energy electron beam from an atomic nucleus-sized positively charged point in space.  The Mott scattering is the theoretical diffraction pattern produced by such a mathematical model.  It is used as the beginning point in calculations in electron scattering diffraction studies.

The equation for the Mott cross section includes an inelastic scattering term to take into account the recoil of the target proton or nucleus. It also can be corrected for relativistic effects of high energy electrons, and for their magnetic moment.

When an experimentally found diffraction pattern deviates from the mathematically derived Mott scattering, it gives clues as to the size and shape of an atomic nucleus This is because the Mott cross section assumes only point-particle Coulombic and magnetic interactions between the incoming electrons and the target. When the target is a charged sphere rather than a point, additions to the Mott cross section equation (form factor terms) can be used to probe the distribution of the charge inside the sphere.

The Born approximation of the diffraction of a beam of electrons by atomic nuclei is an extension of Mott scattering.

References 

 
 

Electron beam
Foundational quantum physics
Scattering